Thomas R. Frieden (born December 7, 1960) is an American infectious disease and public health physician. He serves as president and CEO of Resolve to Save Lives, a $225million, five-year initiative to prevent epidemics and cardiovascular disease.

He was the director of the U.S. Centers for Disease Control and Prevention (CDC), and he was the administrator of the Agency for Toxic Substances and Disease Registry from 2009 to 2017, appointed by President Barack Obama.

As a commissioner of the New York City Department of Health and Mental Hygiene from 2002 to 2009 he came to some prominence for banning smoking in the city's restaurants as well as the serving of trans fat.

Education
Frieden was born and raised in New York City. His father, Julian Frieden, was chief of coronary care at Montefiore Hospital and New Rochelle Hospitals in New York. Frieden attended Oberlin College graduating with a BA degree in philosophy in 1982. He was a community organizer for the Center for Health Services at Vanderbilt University in 1982, before he started studying medicine at Columbia University College of Physicians and Surgeons and graduated with an MD degree in 1986. At the same time he attended Columbia University Mailman School of Public Health and obtained an MPH degree in 1986. He completed a residency in internal medicine at Columbia-Presbyterian Medical Center 1986–1989 followed by a one-year infectious diseases fellowship from 1989 to 1990 at Yale School of Medicine and Yale–New Haven Hospital.

Career

CDC, New York City Department of Health, WHO, 1990–2002
From 1990 to 1992, Frieden worked as an Epidemic Intelligence Service officer assigned by CDC in New York City. From 1992 to 1996, he was assistant commissioner of health and director of the New York City Department of Health and Mental Hygiene, Bureau of Tuberculosis Control, fostering public awareness and helping to improve city, state and federal public funding for TB control. The New York City epidemic was controlled rapidly, reducing overall incidence by nearly half and cutting multidrug-resistant tuberculosis by 80%. The city's program became a model for tuberculosis control nationally and globally.

From 1995 to 2001, Frieden worked as a technical advisor for the World Bank, health and population offices.
From 1996 to 2002, Frieden worked in India, as a medical officer for the World Health Organization on loan from the CDC. He helped the government of India implement the Revised National Tuberculosis Control Program. The program's 2008 status report estimated that the nationwide program resulted in 8million treatments and 1.4million lives saved. While in India, Frieden worked to establish a network of Indian physicians to help India's state and local governments implement the program and helped the Tuberculosis Research Center in Chennai, India, establish a program to monitor the impact of tuberculosis control services.

New York City Health Commissioner, 2002 to 2009
Frieden served as Commissioner of Health of the City of New York from 2002 to 2009. At the time of his appointment, the agency employed 6,000 staff and had an annual budget of $1.6billion. During Frieden's tenure as Commissioner, the Health Department expanded the collection and use of epidemiological data, launching an annual Community Health Survey and the nation's first community-based Health and Nutrition Examination Survey.

Tobacco control, 2002 onward
Upon his appointment as Commissioner of Health, Frieden made tobacco control a priority, resulting in a rapid decline after a decade of no change in smoking rates. Frieden established a system to monitor the city's smoking rates, and worked with New York City Mayor Michael R. Bloomberg to increase tobacco taxes, ban smoking in workplaces including restaurants and bars, and run aggressive anti-tobacco ads and help smokers quit. The program reduced smoking prevalence among New York City adults from 21% in 2002 to 17% in 2007 which represented 300,000 fewer smokers. Smoking prevalence among New York City teens declined even more sharply, from 17.6% in 2001 to 8.5% in 2007, which was less than half the national rate. The workplace smoking ban prompted spirited debate before the New York City Council passed it and Mayor Bloomberg signed it into law. Over time, the measure gained broad acceptance by the public and business community in New York City. New York City's 2003 workplace smoking ban followed that of California in 1994. Frieden supported increased cigarette taxes as a means of reducing smoking and preventing teens from starting, saying "tobacco taxes are the most effective way to reduce tobacco use." He supported the 62-cent federal tax on each cigarette pack sold in the United States, introduced in April 2009. One side effect of the increased taxes on tobacco in New York was a large increase in cigarette smuggling into the state from other states with much lower taxes, such as Virginia. The Tax Foundation estimated that "60.9% of cigarettes sold in New York State are smuggled in from other states". In addition, some New Yorkers began to make their own cigarettes, and tobacco trucks were even hijacked. A 2009 Justice Department study found that "The incentive to profit by evading payment of taxes rises with each tax rate hike imposed by federal, state, and local governments".

Waiving written consent for HIV testing, 2004
Frieden introduced the city's first comprehensive health policy, Take Care New York, which targeted ten leading causes of preventable illness and death for public and personal action. By 2007, New York City had made measurable progress in eight of the ten priority areas.

As Health Commissioner, Frieden sought to fight HIV and AIDS with public health principles used successfully to control other communicable diseases. A very controversial aspect was the proposal to eliminate separate written consent for HIV testing. He believed the measure would encourage physicians to offer HIV tests during routine medical care, as the CDC recommended. Some community and civil liberties advocates fought this legislation, arguing it would undermine patients' rights and lead eventually to forced HIV testing. In 2010, New York State passed a new law that eased the requirement for separate written consent in some circumstances. Frieden's perspective is now widely accepted, and on February 14, 2007, the New York City Department of Health and Mental Hygiene introduced the NYC Condom, prompting Catholic League president Bill Donohue to respond, "What's next? The city's own brand of clean syringes?" More than 36million condoms were given away by the program in 2007.

Diabetes test result reporting, 2006
Frieden worked to raise awareness about diabetes in New York City, particularly among pregnant women, and established an involuntary, non-disclosed hemoglobin A1C diabetes registry which tracks patients' blood sugar control over several months and reports the information to treating physicians to help them provide better care.

The New York City Board of Health's decision to require laboratories to report A1C test results generated a heated debate among civil libertarians, who viewed it as a violation of medical privacy and an intrusion into the doctor-patient relationship. Although patients may elect not to receive information from the program, there is no provision enabling patients to opt out of having their glycemic control data entered in the database.

Transfat plan, 2006
In September 2006, the city proposed to restrict trans fat served in New York restaurants. New York City's trans fat ban followed mandatory labeling of trans fat by the Food and Drug Administration (FDA), was credited with saving lives and preceded by more than a decade the FDA's action to ban trans fat from food throughout the United States.

CDC Director, Agency for Toxic Substances and Disease Registry Administrator, 2009–2017
In May 2009, the White House and the Department of Health and Human Services named Frieden director of the Centers for Disease Control and Prevention and administrator of the Agency for Toxic Substances and Disease Registry; positions he assumed in June 2009, from the acting head Richard E. Besser. Frieden resigned effective January 20, 2017.

On announcing Frieden's appointment, President Obama called him "an expert in preparedness and response to health emergencies" who in seven years as New York City's health commissioner was "at the forefront of the fight against heart disease, cancer and obesity, infectious diseases such as tuberculosis and AIDS, and in the establishment of electronic health records."

Ebola epidemic, 2014

Frieden was prominently involved in the US and global response to the West African outbreak of Ebola. His visits to West Africa beginning in August 2014 and a September 2014 CDC analysis projecting that the Ebola epidemic could increase exponentially to infect more than 1million people within four months prompted him to press for an international surge response. At the peak of the response, CDC maintained approximately 200 staff per day in West Africa and about 400 staff per day at its Atlanta headquarters; overall, about 1,900 CDC staff deployed to international and U.S. locations for about 110,000 total work days, and more than 4,000 CDC staff worked as part of the response. In a Congressional hearing in October 2014, Frieden was asked about his handling of the Ebola crisis after the disease had spread to two nurses from a patient in the US. The day prior, Rep. Tom Marino (R-PA) had called for Frieden's resignation, though others rallied to his defense.

Resolve to Save Lives
In 2017, Frieden started leading an initiative called "Resolve to Save Lives" to prevent cardiovascular disease and epidemics. The effort is funded by Bloomberg Philanthropies, the Chan Zuckerberg Initiative and the Bill & Melinda Gates Foundation and housed at a nongovernmental organization in New York City. Proposed strategies are being tried in various countries  including India, China, and Nigeria. These strategies include working with the World Health Organization to eliminate trans fat and reduce salt consumption worldwide. The salt reduction effort is controversial, with some scientists stating that lower sodium intake may  harm some people. The initiative also works to make countries better prepared for epidemics and have funding to fill preparedness gaps.

Frieden appeared widely in US and global media during the COVID-19 pandemic and became a leading voice sharing science-based analysis of the pandemic via Twitter, while advocating for increased pandemic preparedness, vaccine equity, and stronger public health systems. He appeared on many news shows including The Today Show, CBS News, CNN, PBS, Good Morning America, BBC World News, MSNBC, 
and was quoted in The New York Times, The Wall Street Journal, The Washington Post, STAT, The Hill,  and published articles in leading outlets including on pandemic preparedness, global health security,primary health care, and cardiovascular health. Frieden's op-eds on the pandemic were published in The New York Times,The Wall Street Journal, The Washington Post, and Foreign Affairs.

Frieden co-authored a commentary with Former CDC Directors Jeffrey Koplan, David Satcher, Julie Gerberding, and Richard Besser calling for public health to lead the response to the pandemic, and for a reform of the CDC and US public health system.

In April 2022, Frieden led the transition of Resolve to Save Lives to become an independent, U.S.-based not-for-profit organization after five years of rapid expansion incubated at Vital Strategies.

Working with the World Health Organization, Resolve to Save Lives partnered with countries to expand trans fat bans to more than 40% of the world population.  It is estimated that these bans will save millions of lives.  Frieden has noted that cardiovascular disease kills far more people than Covid, and called for more action to reduce its three leading preventable causes: tobacco use, hypertension, and air pollution. The organization has highlighted unsung successes in public health, including Epidemics That Didn’t Happen, and proposed a global target to reduce the risk of the next pandemic, 7-1-7: 7 days to find every outbreak, 1 day to report it to public health, and 7 days to have all essential control measures in place. Frieden is also Senior Fellow at the Council on Foreign Relations.

Personal life
Frieden is married to Barbara Chang, whom he met in college, and has two children, one of whom, Michael Chang-Frieden is a graduate of Columbia University with the class of 2016. His brother, Jeff Frieden, is professor and chair of the department of government at Harvard University.

In 2017, Frieden was awarded an honorary Sc.D. degree from New York University.

In 2018, Frieden faced misdemeanor charges of forcible touching, third-degree sexual abuse and second-degree harassment. All charges were dropped. He pled guilty to disorderly conduct.

Publications

Frieden has published more than 200 peer reviewed articles.

Frieden TR, Lee CT, Bochner AF, Buissonnière M, McClelland A. 7-1-7 : an organising principle, target, and accountability metric to make the world safer from pandemics. Lancet. 2021[online] S0140-6736(21)01250-2.
Frieden TR., Foti KE. National Initiatives to Prevent Myocardial Infarction and Stroke. JAMA. 2021; 0905.
Frieden TR, Rajkumar R., Mostashari F. We Must Fix US Health and Public Health Policy. AJPH. 2021; 111(4):623-627.
Frieden TR, Cobb LK, Leidig RC, Mehta S, Kass D. Reducing Premature Mortality from Cardiovascular and Other Non-Communicable Diseases by One Third: Achieving Sustainable Development Goal Indicator 3.4.1. Global Heart. 2020;15(1):50.
Cobb LK, Frieden TR, Appel LJ. No U-turn on sodium reduction. J Clin Hypertens. 2020;00:1-5.
Kontis V, Cobb LK, Mathers CD, Frieden TR, Ezzati M, Danaei G. Three public health interventions could save 94 million lives in 25 years. Circulation. 2019;140(9):715-725.

References

External links

 Tom Frieden at Google Scholar

 Resolve to Save Lives 
 Tom Frieden | TIME
 

|-

1960 births
American public health doctors
Centers for Disease Control and Prevention people
Columbia University Vagelos College of Physicians and Surgeons alumni
Columbia University Mailman School of Public Health alumni
Commissioners in New York City
Commissioners of Health of the City of New York
Living people 
Obama administration personnel
Oberlin College alumni
People from New York City 
Place of birth missing (living people)
United States Department of Health and Human Services officials
Directors of the Centers for Disease Control and Prevention